The Antoinette Louisa Brown Blackwell Childhood Home is a historic home located at Henrietta in Monroe County, New York. It is a vernacular Federal style masonry residence constructed of random fieldstone with brick infill.  It was built in 1830 as a -story side-gable-and-wing design and later modified and expanded.  It is notable as the childhood residence of women's rights advocate Antoinette Brown Blackwell (1825–1921), who was the first woman to be ordained as a minister in the United States.

It was listed on the National Register of Historic Places in 1989.

See also
Votes For Women History Trail
Timeline of women's suffrage
Women's suffrage
Women's suffrage in the United States

References

External links

Antoinette Blackwell Home -- NRHP Travel Itinerary

Houses on the National Register of Historic Places in New York (state)
Federal architecture in New York (state)
Houses completed in 1830
Houses in Monroe County, New York
1830 establishments in New York (state)
National Register of Historic Places in Monroe County, New York
History of women in New York (state)